Priory Park  may refer to:

Priory Park, Chichester
Priory Park, Dudley
Priory Park, Great Malvern, home to notable specimens of Davidia involucrata
Priory Park, Haringey, London
Priory Park, Southend-on-Sea
Priory Park, Upton Park, London
Priory Park, Warwick
Priory Park Sports Ground, Taunton

See also
Prior Park